The 1876 Princeton Tigers football team represented the College of New Jersey, more commonly known as Princeton College, in the 1876 college football season. The team finished with a 3–2 record and outscored its opponents, 15–3, but lost to both Harvard and Yale. 1876 was the only year between 1872 and 1881 that Princeton did not claim at least a share of the national championship assigned retroactively by either the Billingsley Report, the National Championship Foundation, or Parke H. Davis. The captain of the team was A. J. McCosh in the fall and B. Nicoll in the spring of 1877.

Schedule

See also
 List of the first college football game in each US state

References

Princeton
Princeton Tigers football seasons
Princeton Tigers football